Fall is a 2022 survival thriller film directed and co-written by Scott Mann and Jonathan Frank.

Fall was theatrically released in the United States on August 12, 2022, by Lionsgate Films. The film was a box office success, grossing $21 million worldwide against a $3 million budget and received generally positive reviews from critics, who praised Mann's direction, the atmosphere, cinematography, suspense, and the performances of Currey and Gardner, but criticized its screenplay, special effects and pacing.

Plot
Best friends Becky and Hunter are climbing a mountain with Becky's husband, Dan, who loses his footing and falls to his death. Nearly a year later, Becky is depressed and abusing alcohol. She has estranged herself from her father, James, because he suggested that Dan was not the right man for her. Just before the anniversary of Dan's death, Hunter invites her to climb the decommissioned  B-67 TV Tower in the desert, where she can scatter Dan's ashes as a form of therapy. Becky at first refuses, then changes her mind and agrees to go so that she can finally move on from Dan's death.

The next day, Hunter and Becky climb to the tiny platform at the top of the tower, where Becky scatters the ashes, finally letting Dan go. As they begin their descent, however, the corroded ladder breaks apart, stranding them several hundred feet above the next intact section. Moreover, the backpack with their water and a small drone has fallen onto a communications dish, just beyond the reach of their rope. 

Despite the remote location, Hunter is confident at first that emergency services would notice the crash of the ladder, but help never arrives. They try to use their cellphones, but suspect that radio interference from the communications dish is blocking the signal. Hunter tries sending a message for help by packing her phone in one of her shoes and dropping it out of range of the interference, but the phone is destroyed before the message transmits.

The pair later notice two men camping in an RV nearby. They wait until dark and fire a flare gun they found in an emergency box on the pole . The men see it, but instead of helping them, they steal Hunter's vehicle and drive off.

As night falls, Becky notices a tattoo on Hunter's ankle: "1-4-3", a numeric code that Dan had used for telling Becky that he loved her. Hunter tearfully admits to a four-month affair that ended shortly before Becky and Dan's wedding, but Becky is unmoved by her apologies. The next day, as penance, Hunter climbs down to tie the rope to the backpack, allowing Becky to pull the water and drone up to the platform. Becky uses the tower's warning light to charge the drone, and sends it with a written message to a diner a few miles away, but it is struck by a truck.

Days later, Becky is delirious from the lack of food and water, but in a brief lucid moment she remembers that when Hunter tried to climb up from the communications dish, she fell back onto it and was killed; Becky has been hallucinating her presence since then. The next day, Becky is awakened by a vulture gnawing at her wounded leg and kills it to eat. Her strength partially restored, Becky climbs down to the dish, types a text message to her father, then puts the phone into Hunter's corpse for protection, and pushes it off the tower. The message transmits, and her father alerts  emergency services, then rushes to the tower to console her after she is rescued.

Cast

 Grace Caroline Currey as Becky Connor
 Virginia Gardner as Hunter Shiloh 
 Mason Gooding as Dan Connor
 Jeffrey Dean Morgan as James Conner

Production

Filming

Originally the film had been intended as a short. According to director Scott Mann, the idea came to him while he was shooting Final Score at a stadium in the U.K.: "We were filming at height, and off camera we got into this interesting conversation about height and the fear of falling and how that's inside of all of us, really, and how that can be a great device for a movie." Fall was filmed in IMAX format in the Shadow Mountains, in California's Mojave Desert. According to director Scott Mann, the filmmakers had considered green screen or digital sets, but ultimately opted for the real thing. They decided to build the upper portion of the tower on top of a mountain so that the actors would really appear to be thousands of feet in the air, even though in real life they were never more than a hundred feet off the ground. Filming was difficult, because often weather such as lightning and strong winds would pose a challenge. The film cost $3 million to produce.

Post-production
Although the film was produced by Tea Shop Productions and Capstone Pictures, once production finished, Lionsgate Films acquired the film's distribution rights without a minimum guarantee for the producers. After it did well in test screenings, Lionsgate decided to release it in theaters. They ordered the crew to change or remove over 30 uses of the word "fuck" from the film so it could earn a PG-13 rating from the Motion Picture Association instead of a likely R-rating, to increase profitability. As reshooting the scenes would have been time-consuming and expensive, they turned to Flawless, a company established in 2021 by Nick Lynes and Fall director Scott Mann, to deepfake the actor's faces and artificially redub the "fuck"s they said to PG-13-acceptable epithets like "freaking." The first project to use Flawless's services, Fall did earn a PG-13 rating. According to Mann, "neural reshoots" were completed within two weeks during the final stages of post-production.

Release
The film was released in theaters in the United States on August 12, 2022, by Lionsgate. Lionsgate spent $4 million to release and promote the film.

The film was released digitally on September 27, 2022, followed by a Blu-ray and DVD release on October 18, 2022.

Reception

Box office 
In the United States and Canada, Fall was released August 12, 2022, alongside Mack & Rita and the wide expansion of Bodies Bodies Bodies, and was projected to gross $1–2 million from 1,548 theaters in its opening weekend. It made $923,000 on its first day, and went on to debut to $2.5 million; while finishing 10th at the box office, it was the highest earning new release for the week. , still showing in China (following a November 18 release), it has grossed $7.2 million in the United States and Canada and $13.5 million in other territories, for total box office of $20.7 million against its $3 million budget.

Critical response

Upcoming sequel 
Following the popularity of the film's Netflix release, a sequel was announced in March of 2023.

References

External links
 
 

2022 films
2022 thriller films
2020s English-language films
2020s survival films
2022 psychological thriller films
2022 drama films
American survival films
British drama films
British survival films
American thriller films
American drama films
British thriller films
Deepfakes
Films directed by Scott Mann
Films about fear
Films about depression
Films shot in the Mojave Desert
Lionsgate films
2020s American films